Laemophloeidae, "lined flat bark beetles," is a family in the superfamily Cucujoidea characterized by predominantly dorso-ventrally compressed bodies, head and pronotal discs bordered by ridges or grooves, and inverted male genitalia. Currently, it contains 40 genera and about 450 species, and is represented on all continents except Antarctica; species richness is greatest in the tropics.

Classicification
Historically, Laemophloeidae was treated as a subfamily of Cucujidae, but starting in the middle of the 20th century, most of what had been treated as subfamilies of the Cucujidae were considered to be families.

Habitat and behaviour
Most laemophloeids, adults and larvae, are found under bark of dead trees, where they apparently are primarily fungivores, although some genera with adults having subcylindrical bodies (e.g., Leptophloeus, Dysmerus) occur in the galleries of bark beetles (Curculionidae: Scolytinae), upon which they may feed. A few genera, but most particularly Cryptolestes, contain some species that are pests of stored grain products. The most important of these are Cryptolestes ferrugineus (Stephens), Cryptolestes pusillus (Schönherr), and Cryptolestes turcicus (Grouvelle).

Characteristics
Several genera exhibit unusual modifications to male antennae (especially Cryptolestes, Dysmerus, and Microbrontes), with the scape expanded into hook-like or blade-like structures. Several other genera (Rhinomalus, Rhinophloeus, and Metaxyphloeus) related to Laemophloeus are atypical in that the adults are rostrate to varying degrees. Photographs of most world genera are available at, and most North American species are pictured at:

Leaping larvae 
According to an article published by PLOS ONE, a discovery has been made regarding the larvae of laemophloeidae. Studies show that when the larvae is in the open, the larvae will straighten themselves out and jump curling up into a ball in the process. It has also been discovered that the larvae can bounce when they are curled up.

Gallery

References

 
Cucujoidea families